Set Apart is a live album from Worship Central. Integrity Music released the album on October 28, 2014. They worked with Ben Cantelon and Tim Hughes, in the production of this album.

Critical reception

Awarding the album four and a half stars at Worship Leader, Bobby Gilles states, "Set Apart is a can't-miss collection." Stella Redburn, rating the album a nine out of ten for Cross Rhythms, writes, "Worship Central continue to lay down a benchmark for other worship ministries." Giving the album four stars from New Release Today, Caitlin Lassiter describes, "Set Apart seems to have served its purpose: empowering believers and giving new songs for the church to lift up to the King." Jonathan Andre, assigning the album four star at 365 Days of Inspiring Media, says, "such an encouraging and uplifiting album!" Indicating in a five star review for Louder Than the Music, Jono Davies writes, "It didn't take long for this album to become an instant classic in my household." Mathew Reames, signaling in a three star review from All about Worship, states, "In the end this is a fine album, but doesn’t really wow."

Awards and accolades
This album was No. 9 on the Worship Leader's Top 20 Albums of 2014 list.

Track listing

References

2014 live albums